Kuno Sekulic (born 19 October 1961) is an Austrian ice hockey player. He competed in the men's tournament at the 1984 Winter Olympics.

References

1961 births
Living people
Olympic ice hockey players of Austria
Ice hockey players at the 1984 Winter Olympics
Sportspeople from Villach